Dyschromatosis symmetrica hereditaria (also known as "reticulate acropigmentation of Dohi", and "symmetrical dyschromatosis of the extremities") is a rare autosomally inherited dermatosis. It is characterized by progressively pigmented and depigmented macules, often mixed in a reticulate pattern, concentrated on the dorsal extremities. It presents primarily in the Japanese, but has also been found to affect individuals from Europe, India and the Caribbean.

Genetics

This disease is caused by mutation in the double stranded RNA specific adenosine deaminase (ADAR1) gene. This gene is located on the long arm of chromosome 1 (1q21).

Diagnosis

Treatment

See also
Skin lesion

References

External links 

Disturbances of human pigmentation